Anjir-e Sefid (also Romanized as Anjīr-e Sefīd; also known as Anjīr-e Sīāh) is a village in Dehdasht-e Sharqi Rural District, in the Central District of Kohgiluyeh County, Kohgiluyeh and Boyer-Ahmad Province, Iran. At the 2006 census, its population was 68, in 16 families.

References 

Populated places in Kohgiluyeh County